OEM is an original equipment manufacturer, a company that makes a part or subsystem that is used in another company's end product.

OEM may also refer to:

Computing
 Object Exchange Model, a model for exchanging data between object-oriented databases
 OEM font, or OEM-US, the original character set of the IBM PC, circa 1981
 Oracle Enterprise Manager, a computer application that aims to manage software produced by Oracle Corporation

Organisations
 OEM International, a former construction company in Gibraltar
 Office for Emergency Management, a World War II function within the Executive Office of the United States Government
 Office of Emergency Management, a general term for emergency management functions
 Oklahoma Department of Emergency Management, for coordinating the response to a natural disaster
 Organización Editorial Mexicana, a Mexican print media company

Other uses
 Occupational and Environmental Medicine, a medical journal

See also